Aliaksei Ivanou (born 17 May 1980) is a Belarusian cross-country skier who has competed swince 2004. At the 2010 Winter Olympics in Vancouver, he finished 45th in the 50 km, 48th in the 30 km mixed pursuit, and 60th in the 15 km events.

Iavnou's best finish at the FIS Nordic World Ski Championships was 13th in the 4 x 10 km relay at Sapporo in 2007 while his best individual finish was 36th in the 50 km event at those sam championships.

His best World Cup finish was ninth in a 4 x 10 km relay at Norway in 2009 while his best individual finish was 42nd in a 30 km event at France in 2006.

References

1980 births
Belarusian male cross-country skiers
Cross-country skiers at the 2010 Winter Olympics
Cross-country skiers at the 2014 Winter Olympics
Living people
Olympic cross-country skiers of Belarus